Andreas Nordebäck (born 12 March 2004) is a Swedish figure skater. He is the 2022 CS Ice Challenge silver medalist and the 2022 CS Finlandia Trophy bronze medalist. 

On the junior level, Nordebäck is the 2022 JGP Czech  Republic bronze medalist, a two-time Swedish junior national champion, and finished in the top 10 at the 2022 World Junior Figure Skating Championships.

Personal life 
Nordebäck was born on 12 March 2004 in Solna, Sweden, a municipality of Stockholm.

Programs

Competitive highlights 
CS: ISU Challenger Series; JGP: Junior Grand Prix

References

External links 
 
 Andreas Nordebäck at #skatesweden

2004 births
Living people
People from Stockholm
Sportspeople from Stockholm
Swedish male single skaters